Avi Bortnick is an American guitarist who became more widely known after his association with jazz guitarist John Scofield. Bortnick joined Scofield's jam-oriented band in 2000 and played rhythm guitar and samples on three albums: Überjam, Up All Night, and  Überjam Deux.

Biography 
Born in Israel, Bortnick was raised in St. Louis, Missouri, where he was immersed in the sounds of funk, rock, and soul. After moving to California, he began to play with African and Caribbean bands. As a graduate student at the University of Florida in Gainesville, he started the band What It Is, which became popular in the southeast touring circuit.

Bortnick became known as a strong rhythm guitar player and came to John Scofield's attention when assembling a band for his album Bump. A five-month tour extended to four-and-a-half years. In 2003, Bortnick released his first solo album, Clean Slate.

Bortnick has played with the Avi B Three, Shitty Shitty Jam Band (with members of The Brazilian Girls), Rene Lopez, Jihae, Erik Deutsch, and Betty Black and the Ghost Train Orchestra.

Discography

As sideman
With Jihae
 Elvis Is Still Alive (Septem, 2008)
 Fire Burning Rain (Septem, 2010)
 Illusion of You (Septem, 2015)

With John Scofield
 Uberjam (Verve, 2002)
 Up All Night (Verve, 2003)
 Uberjam Deux (Verve, 2013)

With others
 Ghost Train Orchestra, Book of Rhapsodies (Accurate, 2013)
 Ghost Train Orchestra, Book of Rhapsodies Vol. II (Accurate, 2017)
 Rene Lopez, Let's Be Strangers Again (Liberation, 2013)

References

Ableton Live users
Living people
American jazz guitarists
Israeli emigrants to the United States
American male guitarists
20th-century American guitarists
20th-century American male musicians
American male jazz musicians
Ghost Train Orchestra members
Year of birth missing (living people)